Lakkamanaickenpatti (Lakkamanāyakkaṉpaṭṭi) is a village located near Vellakoil of Tiruppur district in Tamil Nadu, India.

Administration and politics 
Lakkamanaickenpatti was a part of Coimbatore district and later Erode district and now Tiruppur district. Lakkamanaickenpatti comes under Kangayam taluk, Tiruppur district and headquarters of Vellakovil block. It falls under Kangayam Assembly constituency and Erode Lok Sabha constituency.

AIADMK, DMK and BJP are the major political parties in this area.

See also 

 Vellakoil
 Dharapuram
 Uthiyur

References 

Villages in Tiruppur district